Dali Subdistrict is a subdistrict of Lubei District, in the heart of Tangshan, Hebei, People's Republic of China. , it has 20 residential communities under its administration.
Junxinli Community
Jun'anli Community
Dongdali Community
Huayulou Community
Fenghuangyuan Community
Xingfuhuayuan Community
Jiankelou Community
Changle Community
Yin'anlou Community
Qinyuanliyinhanglou Community
Lijingqinyuan Community
Jinsejiayuan Community
Changchunyuan Community
Shangzuohuayuan Community
Zhangdali Community
Zhangdalixincun Community
Xinglongzhuang Community
Xinhuayuan Community
Maohuafu First Community
Maohuafu Second Community

See also
List of township-level divisions of Hebei

References

Township-level divisions of Hebei
Tangshan